Beta Cephei variables, also known as Beta Canis Majoris stars, are variable stars that exhibit small rapid variations in their brightness due to pulsations of the stars' surfaces, thought due to the unusual properties of iron at temperatures of 200,000 K in their interiors. These stars are usually hot blue-white stars of spectral class B and should not be confused with Cepheid variables, which are named after Delta Cephei and are luminous supergiant stars.

Properties

Beta Cephei variables are main-sequence stars of masses between about 7 and 20 M (that is, 7–20 times as massive as the Sun). Among their number are some of the brightest stars in the sky, such as Beta Crucis and Beta Centauri; Spica is also classified as a Beta Cephei variable but mysteriously stopped pulsating in 1970. Typically, they change in brightness by 0.01 to 0.3 magnitudes with periods of 0.1 to 0.3 days (2.4–7.2 hours). The prototype of these variable stars, Beta Cephei, shows variation in apparent magnitude from +3.16 to +3.27  with a period of 4.57 hours. The point of maximum brightness occurs when the star is smallest and hottest. Their variation in brightness is much greater—up to 1 magnitude—in ultraviolet wavelengths.  A small number of stars have been identified with periods shorter than one hour, corresponding to 1/4 of the fundamental radial pulsation period and 3/8 of the fundamental period.  They also have relatively low amplitudes and a very narrow range of spectral types B2-3 IV-V.  They are known as the short period group and the GCVS acronym BCEPS.

The pulsations of Beta Cephei variables are driven by the kappa mechanism and p-mode pulsations. At a depth within the star where the temperature reaches 200,000 K, there is an abundance of iron. Iron at these temperatures will increase (rather than decrease) in opacity, resulting in the buildup of energy within the layer. This results in increased pressure that pushes the layer back out again, the cycle repeating itself in a matter of hours. This is known as the Fe bump or Z bump (Z standing for the star's metallicity). The similar slowly pulsating B stars show g-mode pulsations driven by the same iron opacity changes, but in less massive stars and with longer periods.

History of observations
American astronomer Edwin Brant Frost discovered the variation in radial velocity of Beta Cephei in 1902, initially concluding it was a spectroscopic binary. Paul Guthnick was the first to detect a variation in brightness, in 1913. Beta Canis Majoris and Sigma Scorpii were found to be variable not long afterwards, Vesto Slipher noted in 1904 that Sigma Scorpii's radial velocity was variable, and R.D. Levee and Otto Struve concluded this was due to the star's pulsations in 1952 and 1955 respectively. These variables were often called Beta Canis Majoris variables because Beta Canis Majoris was the most closely studied example in the first half of the 20th century,  though its location in the southern sky meant that its lowness in the sky hampered observations. However, Beta Cephei was the first member of the class to be discovered and so they are generally called Beta Cephei variables—despite the similarity of name (and risk of confusion) with Cepheid variables.

Cecilia Payne-Gaposchkin and Sergei Gaposchkin catalogued 17 probable members of the class in their 1938 Variable Stars, though classified them with Delta Scuti variables. 16 Lacertae was another star extensively studied before 1952. The number known jumped from 18 to 41 in 1966. Otto Struve studied these stars extensively in the 1950s, however research declined after his death.

Christiaan L. Sterken and Mikolaj Jerzykiewicz classed 59 stars as definite and 79 more as suspected Beta Cephei variables in 1993. Stankov listed 93 members of the class in a 2005 catalogue, plus 77 candidates and 61 poor or rejected stars. Six stars, namely Iota Herculis, 53 Piscium, Nu Eridani, Gamma Pegasi, HD 13745 (V354 Persei) and 53 Arietis had been found to exhibit both Beta Cephei and SPB variability.

In 2021 β Cru became the first star of any kind to have its pulsation modes identified using polarimetric asteroseismology.

List of Beta Cephei variables

List of former, excluded or candidate Beta Cephei variables

References